Erich Spahn (17 September 1948 – 19 December 2009) was a Swiss road and track cyclist. He competed in the 1970 and 1972 Giro d'Italia, and won the Tour du Nord-Ouest in 1971 and 1972.

Major results
1968
 6th Overall Tour of Hellas
1st Stages 1 & 7
1969
 1st Kaistenberg Rundfahrt
 2nd GP du canton d'Argovie
1970
 1st  Omnium, National Track Championships
 1st Six Days of Zürich (with Fritz Pfenninger & Peter Post)
1971
 1st Tour du Nord-Ouest
 5th Züri-Metzgete
1972
 1st Tour du Nord-Ouest
 3rd Road race, National Road Championships
 4th Overall Tour de Suisse
1974
 1st  Omnium, National Track Championships
 10th Overall Tour de Suisse

References

External links
 

1948 births
2009 deaths
Swiss male cyclists
Sportspeople from the canton of Zürich
Swiss track cyclists